Pyli is the name of several geographical locations in Greece:

 Pyli, a municipality in the Trikala regional unit
 Pyli, Boeotia, a village in Beotia
 Pyli, Florina, a village in the Florina (regional unit)
 Pyli, a village on the island of Kos